Pier Palma da Fermo (15th century) was an Italian painter in the provinces of Fermo and Macerata. He painted a venerated image (1475) of the Madonna della Misericordia for the church of the Madonna della Misericordia, Petriolo. The municipality of Monte Urano restored his fresco of the Madonna delle Nevi.

References

Year of birth unknown
Year of death unknown
Italian male painters
15th-century Italian painters
Gothic painters